The Augsburg-Western Woods Nature Park is one of the two nature parks in Bavarian Swabia.
The nature park is bordered by the rivers Danube, Wertach, Schmutter, Flossach and Mindel. The biggest part of it is located in Augsburg (district) and extends to the edge of the districts Unterallgäu, Günzburg (district) and Dillingen (district).

Landscape 
The gentle, hilly landscape is divided by the streams Schmutter, Neufnach and Zusam into gently undulating plateaus and flat interfluves. It is part of the Tertiary Hills between the Danube and the Bavarian Alpine Foreland. Nearly half (43%) of the region are forested and the proportion of grassland are high, too. The northern part around Welden is named Holzwinkel, the middle part around Dinkelscherben, Reischenau and the south part (south of the line Thannhausen-Ziemetshausen-Fischach-Gessertshausen-Stadtbergen) are the Stauden.

Sights and attractions

Nature-Park-House near Oberschönenfeld Abbey 
The Nature-Park-House, which was opened in the year 1992, is located in an adjoining building of Oberschönenfeld Abbey south of Gessertshausen. In the rooms of the Nature-Park-House the exhibition Nature and Men in the Nature-Park is shown. Furthermore there is near the Nature-Park-House the last thatched Staudenhaus, a little farm house in the type of construction which was typical in the Stauden. This house was rebuilt at this place between the years 1974 and 1980. In the stables, unused since 1972, the Bezirk Schwaben established the Swabian Folklore and Crafts Museum (Schwäbische Volkskundemuseum) in 1984.

Further attractions and sights in the Augsburg-Westliche Wälder Nature Park 

 people's observatory in Streitheim
 Nemetons and former castles, built in the Middle Ages (for example the Haldenburg near Schwabegg)
 Fuggercastle Kirchheim, from the 18th century, with the „Cedarhall“, one of the most beautiful renaissancehalls of Europe. The hall has a coffered ceiling with timber of Cedar from the Lebanon and 14 native kinds of wood, all in natura.
 pilgrimage church of St. Michael in Violau and observatory from the 18th century
 pilgrimage church of Maria Vesperbild near Ziemetshausen
 pilgrimage church in Biberbach
 pilgrimage church of Allerheiligen near Scheppach (municipality Jettingen-Scheppach)
 church of St. Thekla in Welden
 many little baroque- and rococo-churches in the "Swabian Pfaffenwinkel"

Gallery

See also 
 List of nature parks in Germany

References

External links

 Nature park website

Nature parks in Bavaria
Augsburg (district)
Dillingen (district)
Günzburg (district)
Unterallgäu
Swabia (Bavaria)
Protected areas established in 1988
1988 establishments in West Germany